TSS Anglia was a twin screw steamer passenger vessel operated by the London and North Western Railway from 1920 to 1923, and the London, Midland and Scottish Railway from 1923 to 1935.

History
She was built by William Denny and Brothers of Dumbarton and launched on 11 November 1919.

On 15 January 1922 she collided with the breakwater at Holyhead harbour, and was laid up from 1924. She was then only used infrequently, typically during holiday periods.

In 1935 she was scrapped.

References

1919 ships
Ships built on the River Clyde
Passenger ships of the United Kingdom
Ships of the London and North Western Railway
Steamships of the United Kingdom